The Nijmegen railway bridge is a truss bridge spanning the River Waal, connecting the city of Nijmegen to the town of Lent in the Netherlands.

Construction

Construction started in 1875, on the site of an ancient Roman bridge, and was completed 4 years later in 1879. It originally consisted of 3 truss arches. The southern land abutment, styled as a medieval city gate, was designed by Dutch architect P.J.H Cuypers. These tower structures served the purposes of protecting the entrance to the city of Nijmegen. The railway bridge's construction meant that train connections to Arnhem were possible, thus Nijmegen was the last major city in the Netherlands to be connected to the national rail network.

Second World War

The middle arch of the bridge was destroyed twice during the Second World War, but despite this it survived the conflict. The first demolition was initiated on 10 May 1940 by the Dutch themselves when the Wehrmacht approached. The Germans repaired the bridge, and it was back in service by 17 November 1940.

The abutment was also damaged by the Germans, who mounted anti-aircraft guns on each of the towers. The bridge was involved in Operation Market Garden, and was intended to be a key objective for the Allies to hold. The 82nd Airborne Division's assault on the bridge in September 1944 received the nickname "Little Omaha" due to the heavy casualties, and became a significant turning point in the battle.

Despite the efforts of the Americans, frogmen from the German Marine Einsatzkommando were able to demolish the bridge again on 28 September 1944.

Reconstruction
The bridge was reconstructed in 1984, still in the truss style but only one arch was kept in the design. Only the brick abutment remains from the original structure. This land abutment was to be demolished during the reconstruction but protests from the local Nijmegen residents prevented this and it was instead declared a national monument. In 2004, a bicycle bridge known as the Snelbinder was added to the eastern side of the bridge. The third level of the bridge was reconstructed in 2008, precisely from the original building plans.

Literature evocation
In the short story of  J.H.F. Grönloh (Nescio) "De uitvreter", the main character commits suicide by stepping from the bridge.

References

Truss bridges
Bridges completed in 1879
Bridges completed in 1984
Bridges over the Rhine
Railway bridges in the Netherlands
Steel bridges in the Netherlands
Bridges in Nijmegen
Rijksmonuments in Nijmegen